Adosterol is an iodine-containing sterol.

References 

Sterols
Organoiodides